Coronary heart disease, susceptibility to, 8 is a protein that in humans is encoded by the CHDS8 gene.

References